Rodney Howarth Slate (10 June 1930 – 14 November 1999) was an Australian rules footballer who played with St Kilda in the Victorian Football League (VFL).

Notes

External links 

1930 births
1999 deaths
Australian rules footballers from Victoria (Australia)
St Kilda Football Club players